Relay is a chain of newspaper, magazine, book, and convenience stores, mostly based in train stations and airports. It is owned by Lagardère Travel Retail, a subsidiary of Lagardère Group.

Its heaviest concentration is in France, but it also operates in other countries. In 2010, the network had 1,100 shops on 4 continents.

History
Relay started under the name Relais H''', when in 1852 Louis Hachette acquired the "trainstations' libraries". The sales of newspapers quickly overperformed the sales of books. To keep books' sales up, Relais H innovated by creating book series and asking specific authors to write those series.

In January 2000, the stores Relais H became Relay''. At that time, Relay owns 1,000 stores in 10 countries in Europe and North America.

In October 2012, Lagardere TR created a joint-venture with Indian Travel Food Services to develop Relay in India.

In February 2016, Lagardere sold its Travel Retail operations in Belgium to the Bpost group for $491 million.

See also 
 Relay (disambiguation)

References

External links

www.relay.com Official website

Lagardère Group
Retail companies established in 1852
Retail companies of France
1852 establishments in France